The 5th Military Region of Vietnam People's Army, is directly under the Ministry of Defence of Vietnam, tasked to organise, build, manage and command armed forces defending the South Central Vietnam include the Tây Nguyên and southern central coastal provinces. In the period of Vietnam War, 5th Military Zone included the coastal provinces of Middle Central Vietnam, 6th Military Zone included the old South Central Vietnam (including Ninh Thuận Province, Bình Thuận Province, Lâm Đồng Province, Đắk Nông Province today) and the front Tây Nguyên (Northern and Central of Tây Nguyên) was merged into 5th Military Zone after Vietnam unification.

 Command Headquarters:  Da Nang city 
 Commander: Lieutenant General Thái Đại Ngọc 
 Political Commissar: Lieutenant General Trịnh Đình Thạch     
 Deputy Commander cum Chief of Staff: Senior Colonel Lê Ngọc Hải

Agencies
 Department of Staff 
 Department of Politics  
 Division of Organisation 
 Division of Cadre 
 Division of Policy 
 Division of Propogendar and Training 
 Division of Thoughts and Culture 
 Military Court of Military Zone
 Military Procuratorate of Military Zone 
 Military Museum of 5th Military Zone 
 Newspaper of 5th Military Zone 
 Troupe of 5th Military Zone
 Department of Logistics
 Department of Technology
 Office of Command of 5th Military Zone

Units
 Military Command of Da Nang Municipality  
 Military Command of Quảng Nam Province  
 Military Command of Quảng Ngãi Province 
 Military Command of Bình Định Province 
 Military Command of Phú Yên Province
 Military Command of Khánh Hòa Province 
 Military Command of Kon Tum Province 
 Military Command of Gia Lai Province 
 Military Command of Đắc Lắc Province - Political Commissar: Major General Võ Duy Chín (2008), honoured as Hero of the People's Armed Forces (1976)
 Military Command of Đắk Nông Province 
 Military Command of Ninh Thuận Province 
 Military School of Military Zone
 2nd Division 
 305th Division 
 307th Division 
 315th Division 
 368th Artillery Regiment (honored as Hero of People's Armed Forces 2008) 
 270th Combat Engineering Brigade

Successive Commander and Leadership

Commanders

 Lieutenant General Hoàng Văn Thái  (1966-1967), later promoted to full general in 1980.
 Major General Chu Huy Mân (1967–1976): General (1980), Director of the General Political Department Vietnam People's Army (1977–1986). 
 Major General Đoàn Khuê (1977–1980): Lieutenant General (1980), Colonel General (1984), General (1990), Minister of Ministry of Defence of Vietnam (1991–1997) 
 Lieutenant General Nguyễn Huy Chương 
 Lieutenant General Nguyễn Chơn (-1994) 
 Lieutenant General Phan Hoan -(-1994) 
 Lieutenant General Nguyễn Văn Được (- 2002): Deputy Minister of  Ministry of Defence of Vietnam 
 Lieutenant General Nguyễn Khắc Nghiên (2002–2005): then promoted to First Deputy Minister of Defence of Vietnam, Chief of General Staff of the Vietnam People's Army. 
 Lieutenant General Huỳnh Ngọc Sơn (- 9/2007): vice-Chairman of National Assembly of Vietnam XII. 
 Lieutenant General Nguyễn Trung Thu (9/2007-2010)
 Lieutenant General Lê Chiêm (2011-4/2015)
 Major General Nguyễn Long Cáng (4/2015-10/2020) Lieutenant General (9/2015) 
 Lieutenant General Thái Đại Ngọc (10/2020-present)

Political Commissioners, Deputy Commanders of Politics 
 Lieutenant General Hoàng Văn Thái (1966-1967)
 Colonel General Chu Huy Mân (1975–1976)  
 Colonel General Đoàn Khuê (1977–1980) 
 Lieutenant General Nguyễn Huy Chương 
 Lieutenant General Tiêu Văn Mẫn 
 Lieutenant General Nguyễn Thành Út  
 Major General Nguyễn Văn Thảng, Lieutenant General (2007) 
 Major General Nguyễn Thành Đức (2007-2011), Lieutenant General (2009) 
 Major General Trần Quang Phương (2011-2019), Lieutenant General (9/2015) 
 Lieutenant General Trịnh Đình Thạch  (2019-present)

References

Military regions of the People's Army of Vietnam